The women's heptathlon event at the 2009 European Athletics U23 Championships was held in Kaunas, Lithuania, at S. Dariaus ir S. Girėno stadionas (Darius and Girėnas Stadium) on 18 and 19 July.

Medalists

Results

Final
18-19 July

Participation
According to an unofficial count, 15 athletes from 13 countries participated in the event.

 (1)
 (1)
 (1)
 (1)
 (1)
 (1)
 (1)
 (1)
 (1)
 (3)
 (1)
 (1)
 (1)

References

Heptathlon
Combined events at the European Athletics U23 Championships